Dongshan River Water Park, established in 1993, is a park located in Wujie Township, Yilan County, Taiwan, on the shores of the Dongshan River. Its slogan is "Near water, Have green" (親近水、擁有綠). It is one of Taiwan's most famous scenic spots. The Yilan International Children's Folklore and Folkgame Festival was held in the park annually until 2007. Due to SARS, the festival was cancelled in 2003.

Transportation
The park is accessible East from Luodong Station of the Taiwan Railways.

See also
 List of parks in Taiwan

References

1993 establishments in Taiwan
Parks in Yilan County